Light Blue: Arthur Blythe Plays Thelonious Monk is jazz saxophonist Arthur Blythe's sixth album for the Columbia label, recorded in New York City in 1983. The album features Blythe's quintet performing six compositions by Thelonious Monk.

Reception
The AllMusic review by Scott Yanow awarded the album 3 stars and states "these creative players (and the unusual instrumentation) put a fresh slant on Monk's music. Blythe's passionate sound throughout this inspired set is consistently memorable".

Track listing
All compositions by Thelonious Monk.
 "We See" - 6:30  
 "Light Blue" - 5:12  
 "Off Minor" - 6:48  
 "Epistrophy" - 8:38  
 "Coming On the Hudson" - 6:05  
 "Nutty" - 6:45
It was recorded at CBS Recording Studios, New York.

Personnel
Arthur Blythe - alto saxophone 
Abdul Wadud - cello 
Kelvyn Bell - guitar
Bob Stewart - tuba 
Bobby Battle - drums

References

1983 albums
Columbia Records albums
Arthur Blythe albums
Thelonious Monk tribute albums